In plasma physics, Woltjer's theorem states that force-free magnetic fields in a closed system with constant force-free parameter  represent the state with lowest magnetic energy in the system and that the magnetic helicity is invariant under this condition. It is named after Lodewijk Woltjer who derived it in 1958. The force-free field strength  equation is

The helicity  invariant is given by

where  is related to  through the vector potential  as below

See also
Chandrasekhar–Kendall function
Hydrodynamical helicity

References 

Astrophysics
Plasma physics